The Col du Bonhomme (elevation ) is a mountain pass in the Vosges Mountains of France. The pass connects Kaysersberg (Haut-Rhin) with Saint-Dié-des-Vosges (Vosges) (east–west) and is also crossed by the Route des Crêtes (north–south). The pass takes its name from the nearby village of Le Bonhomme, 6 km to the east.

History
Between 1871 and 1918, the pass was a border crossing between Lorraine (France) and Alsace, which had been ceded to Germany under the Treaty of Frankfurt. A stone marking the former border is situated 100 m south of the pass on D148 (Route des Crêtes).

During World War I, the pass was the scene of fighting between French and German soldiers. On 8 September 1914, the commander of the French 41st Infantry Division, 69-year-old General Bataille, and six of his men were killed in a German artillery attack. A memorial to the General and his men stands at the pass.

Details of climbs
From the east, the climb starts at Ammerschwihr, passing through Kaysersberg and Le Bonhomme en route.

From the west, the climb starts at Saulcy-sur-Meurthe passing through Fraize. The maximum gradient is 6.5%.

The total distance is  gaining  in height at an average gradient of 3.2%. The central section, the last  before the Col du Pré de Raves averages 6.5%.

Tour de France
The climb over the pass has been used in the Tour de France cycle race, the first time being on the penultimate stage of the 1949 tour, an individual mountain time trial won by Fausto Coppi.

References

External links
Biography of General Marie Désiré Pierre Bataille on French Wikipedia 
Col du Bonhomme on Google Maps (Tour de France classic climbs)

Transport in Grand Est
Mountain passes of Grand Est
Bonhomme